Roman Emelyanov (in Russian Роман Емельянов) (born 3 June 1975 in Moscow, Soviet Union) is a Russian radio and television personality.

In 1995–1996, Emelyanov (also pronounced Yemelyanov in Russian) worked as an "Autoradio" musical program narrator and in 1998–1999 broadcasting radio musical program narrator, art-director of "7 up the 7 Hills". From 1999 until 2004, he became the "El’Doradio" show narrator, public relations manager in Sankt Petersburg. In 2004 he moved to Retro-FM as a special programs producer and from 2007 to date, he is the Program Director of "Russkoe Radio".

In 2011, he became one of the judges of the musical talent competition Faktor A, the Russian version of The X Factor on Russia 1 television

References

1975 births
Living people
Russian radio personalities
Russian television personalities